Palukuru is a village in the Kandukur mandal of the Prakasam district, from the state of Andhra Pradesh, India, located 33 kilometers south of district headquarters Ongole.

Palukuru is one of the biggest villages in the Prakasam district & Kandukur mandal, with a population of 5,849 and vast amounts of agricultural land. It is connected to two big towns (mandals),  Kandukur ( away) and Singarayakonda ( away).

The pin code of Palukuru is 523101 and its postal head office is S. Konda, or Singarayakonda.

The 5 villages that surround Palukuru are Oguru, Vikkiralapeta, Nandanavanam, Kondikandukur, Kanumalla.

Kandukur, Ongole and Kavali are cities that are in close proximity to Palukuru.

It is close to the Bay of Bengal and the weather is humid most of the time. The locals speak Telugu & Urdu.

 Households: 1,436
 Total Population: 5,849
 Male Population: 2,998
 Female Population: 2,849

Places of Worship

 2 Sri Rama Temples
 4 Ankamma Talli Temples 
 Veerabadraswami Temple
 Veera Brahmendra Swami Temple
 Poleramma Temple
 Mavullamma Temple
 Nagarpamma
 Devara Amma Gudi
 Lord Vishnu Temple
 Ankammatalli Temple
 Chenna Keshvaswamy Temple
 Gangamma Talli
 Lord Shiva Temple
 Sri Ayyappa Swamy Temple
 Renuka Ammavaru
 2 Anjaneya statues
 2 churches
 A mosque
 Brahmakumari samajam

The 24-hour Bajana & Palukur Ayyaswami Bajana, are famous in this village.

Schools
 Anganvaadi Schools (Pindi Badi)
 Elementary School (Chinna badi)
 Zpph School (Pedda badi)
 Kerala English Medium School
 Mpp Schools

The village has an average literacy rate of 45.5.

Sport
The village is famous for these sports and competitions:

 Ball badminton
 Kabaddi
 Kho-Kho
 Cricket
 Volleyball
 Shuttle

Festivals
 Makar Sankranti 
 Vinayaka Chathurthi
 Maha Shivaratri 
 Kaarthika Paurnami
 Ramadan
 Christmas 
 Deepavali
 Kolupulu

Transport

Road connectivity is present from Kandukur to Palukur.

By rail: Singarayakonda railway station is the closest railway station to Palukur.

By bus: Jarugumalli APSRTC Bus Station, Kandukur APSRTC Bus Station and Singaraya Konda APSRTC Bus Station are the nearest bus stations to Palukur. APSRTC runs several buses from major cities to here.

Demographics
In the 2001 India census, Palukuru had a population of 2,100. Males constitute 50.08% of the population and females 49.19%. The village has an average literacy rate of 41.5. The literacy rate of males in the village is 72%, while that of females is 55%.

References

Villages in Prakasam district